The 2015–16 Austrian Football First League  (German: Erste Liga, also known as Sky Go Erste Liga due to sponsorship) was the 42nd season of the Austrian second-level football league. It began on 24 July 2015 and ended on 25 May 2016.

Teams
Ten teams participate in the 2015-16 season. Austria Salzburg was directly promoted after winning the 2014–15 Regionalliga West. Austria Klagenfurt promoted from the Regionalliga Mitte after winning the promotion play-offs. Wiener Neustadt relegated from the 2014–15 Bundesliga.

Personnel and kits

League table

Results
Teams played each other four times in the league. In the first half of the season each team played every other team twice (home and away), and then did the same in the second half of the season.

First half of season

Second half of season

Season statistics

Top goalscorers
.

Top assists
.

See also
 2015–16 Austrian Football Bundesliga
 2015–16 Austrian Cup

References

External links
 Austrian Football First League at Bundesliga.at 

2. Liga (Austria) seasons
2015–16 in Austrian football
Aus